Île Rouleau is an impact crater in Baie-James, Quebec, Canada, located on a small, uninhabited island in Lake Mistassini in the centre of the province.

Part of the crater is exposed to the surface, but most of it is under the waters of the lake.

References

Further reading 
 Caty, J. L., Chown, E.H. and Roy,D.W., A new astrobleme: Ile Rouleau structure, Lake Mistassini, Quebec. Canadian Journal of Earth Sciences, v. 13, pp. 824–831. 1976
 Evangelatos, J., Butler, K.E. and Spray, J.G., A marine magnetic study of a carbonate-hosted impact structure: Ile Rouleau, Canada. Geophysical Journal International, v. 179, pp. 171–181. 2009

External links 
 Aerial Exploration of the Ile Rouleau Structure

Impact craters of Quebec
Landforms of Nord-du-Québec
Permian impact craters